Taşıtlı is a village in the Hozat District, Tunceli Province, Turkey. The village is populated by Kurds of the Bahtiyar tribe and had a population of 48 in 2021.

The hamlets of Boyalı, Çamyazı, Gözlek, Kızılkom, Kızılmezra, Kızıltaş, Komlar and Şaşaliler are attached are the village.

References 

Kurdish settlements in Tunceli Province
Villages in Hozat District